Tønsberg Cove is a cove  southeast of Penguin Point on the north coast of Coronation Island, in the South Orkney Islands. It was charted in 1912-13 by Petter Sørlle, a Norwegian whaling captain and named after the Tønsberg Hvalfangeri, of Tønsberg, Norway, a company which operated a permanent whaling base in the South Orkney Islands in the period 1920–30.

References

Coronation Island
Coves of the South Orkney Islands